Christopher R. Coppola (born January 25, 1962) is an American film director and producer.

Early life
Coppola was born in Los Angeles County, California. His father, the late August Coppola, was a professor of literature, while his mother, Joy Vogelsang, was a dancer and choreographer. Coppola studied music composition at the University of Redlands from 1979 to 1980; he also attended San Francisco Art Institute, earning a BS in Film/Cinema/Video Studies in 1985.

Career
Coppola began filmmaking at an early age and has directed eight feature films and a number of television shows. He premiered his feature film Creature of the Sunnyside Up Trailer Park at the 2003 Toronto International Film Festival. His television show Biker Chef premiered at the 2004 Oldenburg Film Festival in Germany.

Coppola is the president of Christopher R. Coppola Productions (CRC Productions). In 2006, Coppola launched the digital film festival PAH-FEST (Project Accessible Hollywood) in New Mexico. In addition to New Mexico, Coppola has taken PAH-FEST across the US, as well as Germany and Slovenia. Coppola's CRC Productions is also developing and producing content for alternative distribution and interactive platforms.

In April 2013, Coppola was appointed by Governor Jerry Brown to serve on the California Arts Council.

Personal life
Through his father, Coppola is the nephew of Francis Ford Coppola and Talia Shire, as well as the cousin of Sofia Coppola, Robert Schwartzman, and Jason Schwartzman. Coppola's two brothers are Nicolas Cage and Marc Coppola.

Filmography

Director 
Dracula's Widow (1988)
Deadfall (1993)
Gunfight at Red Dog Corral (1993)
Clockmaker (1998)
The Gunfighter (1999)
Palmer's Pick Up (1999)
Bel Air (2000)
G-Men from Hell (2000)
The Creature of the Sunny Side Up Trailer Park (2004)
From Darkness to Light (2011)
Sacred Blood (2015)
Universe at Play (2017) (video game)
Torch (2017)
Paradise Found (TBA)

Producer 
Deadfall (1993) (co-producer)
The Creature of the Sunny Side Up Trailer Park (2004)

See also 
Coppola family tree

References

External links
 Christopher Coppola's homepage 
Digivangelist at ReelzChannel
PAH NATION – Project Accessible Hollywood

A conversation with Christopher Coppola (scroll down on Fangoria page to read)

1962 births
Christopher 
American people of German descent
People of Campanian descent
People of Lucanian descent
American people of Italian descent
Living people
People from Los Angeles County, California
Film directors from California
University of Redlands alumni